"We Have Explosive" is a song by The Future Sound of London, released in 1997. It was the band's most successful single, getting to number 12 in the UK Singles Chart in 1997. It features prominent sampling of the Run-DMC album Tougher Than Leather. Part three also samples "Rockchester" by Fats Comet.

The single
The successful standout single from FSOL's Dead Cities LP was, as with other FSOL singles, released with a plethora of remixed versions of it. It is a harder, more techno-oriented song, which is rare for the band; the track became well known to many after being featured in the 1996 hit video game wipE'out" 2097. The song is the first track on the soundtrack, remixes of it were also featured on the other versions of the soundtrack; the "Herd Killing" mix was used in the intro sequence. 

A remixed version also appeared on the soundtrack for Mortal Kombat: Annihilation.

Track listing
The track listing below is the "CD-Maxi" listing.
 "We Have Explosive (Pt. 1)" (7:19)
 "We Have Explosive (Pt. 2) (Remixed by Leon Mar)" (2:48)
 "We Have Explosive (Pt. 3)" (5:04)
 "We Have Explosive (Pt. 4)" (6:17)
 "We Have Explosive (Pt. 5)" (7:53)
 "We Have Explosive (Oil Funk Remix)" (3:36)
 "We Have Explosive (Mantronik Plastic Formula #1)" (5:38)
 "We Have Explosive (Oil Dub)" (6:23)
 "We Have Explosive (Radio Mix)" (3:27)

Chart position

Crew credits
Artwork By [Additional Design] - Ian Kay
Artwork By [Layout And Typography] - FSOL
Artwork By [Oil Texture] - Buggy & Riphead
Artwork By [Sleeve Image] - Run Wrake from the film Juke Box
Engineer - Yage
Producer, Written-By - Future Sound Of London, The
Samples of Guitar stab, wah guitar and vocal yell from, among other things, Run DMC LP "Tougher Than Leather".

References

External links
 
 

1997 singles
The Future Sound of London songs
1997 songs
Virgin Records singles
Astralwerks singles